Aleksey Danilovich Kivshenko (22 March 1851, Venyov, Tula Governorate, Russian Empire — 2 October 1895, Heidelberg) was a Russian Imperial painter, primarily of historical scenes. Among the best-known were those depicting the Russo-Turkish Wars. He also created hunting and genre scenes and was associated with the Peredvizhniki.

Biography
He was born on a small stud farm. His father was interested in art and music, so he encouraged his son's early attempts at drawing. His first studies began when he was nine; at the Imperial Society for the Encouragement of the Arts with Ivan Kramskoi.

From 1867 to 1877, he was a student at the Imperial Academy of Arts, under the direction of Kārlis Hūns. He also audited classes at the State Institute of Technology and the Medico-Surgical Academy, but these were not to his liking. While there, he helped support himself by working as a scribe for the Admiralty Board.

In 1880, after receiving a foreign fellowship, he began to travel extensively, visiting Paris, Düsseldorf and Munich, where he worked with Gabriel von Max and Wilhelm von Diez.  When he returned in 1884, the paintings he had produced earned him the title of "Academician". Later that year, he was commissioned by Tsar Alexander III to create scenes from the recent Russo-Turkish War, so he went to Transcaucasia to make sketches. He also taught drawing at the Saint Petersburg Art and Industry Academy until 1889.

In 1891, he accompanied Nikodim Kondakov on an archaeological expedition to Palestine and Syria, returning with numerous sketches of everyday life in the region, as well as the ancient buildings. Many of these were used as book decorations. In 1893, he became a full member of the Academy and taught a class in battle painting. He died of undisclosed causes during a visit to Germany.

Selected paintings

References

External links 

 Biographical notes and more paintings @ Воскресный день 
 Russian archaeologists in Jericho @ Императорского Православного Палестинского Общества (Imperial Orthodox Palestine Society).

1851 births
1895 deaths
19th-century painters from the Russian Empire
Russian male painters
History painters
Russian genre painters
People from Venyovsky District
Military art
19th-century male artists from the Russian Empire
Imperial Academy of Arts alumni
Members of the Imperial Academy of Arts
Awarded with a large gold medal of the Academy of Arts